The Lowdown is a documentary series for young people first broadcast on Children's BBC in 1988. Reminiscent of World in Action and Panorama it was produced by Landseer Productions, and broadcast after Newsround (and similar to Newsround Extra) until 1998.

One episode of the documentary (filmed in Page Moss, Liverpool in 1992) looked at an educational programme called "Child to Child" and how it was being used to combat problems with solvent abuse that were prevalent in the area at the time.

References

External links

See also
Wise Up
Panorama
World In Action
Newsround

1988 British television series debuts
1998 British television series endings
BBC children's television shows
1980s British children's television series
1990s British children's television series
BBC television documentaries